Echuca is a town on the banks of the Murray River and Campaspe River in Victoria, Australia. The border town of Moama is adjacent on the northern side of the Murray River in New South Wales. Echuca is the administrative centre and largest settlement in the Shire of Campaspe.

Echuca lies within traditional Yorta Yorta country. The town's name is a Yorta Yorta word meaning "meeting of the waters". Echuca is close to the junction of the Goulburn, Campaspe, and Murray Rivers. Its position at the closest point of the Murray to Melbourne contributed to its development as a thriving river port city during the 19th century.

History

Origins

The riverine plains of the Goulburn Broken catchment are the traditional lands of the Yorta Yorta nation. Their population before European contact is estimated to have been approximately 2400. The Yorta Yorta were dispossessed of their traditional lands and left to eke out an existence on the edges of European settlements as remnant tribal groups.

Present-day Echuca was founded by one of the most enterprising figures of the early colonial period, an ex-convict named Henry Hopwood. In 1850 he purchased a small punt to ferry people and goods across the Murray River near the Campaspe junction. The small settlement known as Hopwood's Ferry grew to become the town of Echuca. The Hopwood's Punt Post Office opened around 1854 and was renamed Echuca Post Office on 1 January 1855.

Australia's inland port
By the 1870s, Echuca had risen to prominence as Australia's largest inland port. Being the point of shortest distance between the Murray River and the major city of Melbourne, Echuca was both a key river port and railway junction. Paddle steamers would arrive at the 332-metre long redgum Echuca Wharf, were unloaded by hydraulic crane, and the goods then transported by rail to Melbourne. Wool, wheat, other grains, livestock, and timber were the most common commodities transported to Echuca. The wharf has been listed as a Heritage Place on the Australian National Heritage List.

This industrial boom led to a rapidly expanding population, from 26 inhabitants in 1854 to 4789 during the peak year of 1871. More than 80 pubs/hotels serviced the needs of the town, but it is rumoured that many more sly-grog shops, wine shanties, and beer houses, circumventing licensing laws existed in the area. An iron bridge was constructed over the Murray River in 1878 by the NSW Railways Department.

Decline

The expansion of the railways from Melbourne to most parts of Victoria, as well as improvements to roads and fickle river conditions all combined to lessen Echuca's importance, and by the 1890s the paddle steamer fleet was in decline. An economic depression and the collapse of several banks virtually ended Echuca's role as a major economic centre, and its population began to disperse.

Population
 Aboriginal and Torres Strait Islander people made up 4.1% of the population. 
 85.3% of people were born in Australia. The next most common countries of birth were England 1.7% and New Zealand 1.1%.
 89.4% of people spoke only English at home. 
 The most common responses for religion were No Religion 42.7%, Catholic 21.8% and Anglican 12.4%.

Geography
The area lies on the Northern Plains Grassland.

Climate
Echuca has a semi-arid climate (BSk) with Mediterranean climate (Csa) tendencies.

Governance

Echuca is the administrative centre for the Campaspe Shire Council.

At the state level, Echuca is represented by the Electoral district of Murray Plains.

At the federal level, Echuca is represented by the Division of Nicholls.

Economy
The main industry in Echuca is tourism; it earns about $250 million a year for the Echuca economy. Visitors are attracted to the town by its warm climate, the Murray River and its paddle steamers, recreational attractions, and historical features, some of which have come to public awareness by the Nancy Cato novel All the Rivers Run, which was made into a TV miniseries.

Echuca is also a major regional service economy.

Agriculture is very important to the region. Dairy, wheat, sheep, pig, and cattle farms are all within close proximity.

Culture

Paddle steamers

The port is home to the largest paddle steamer fleet in the world, which includes the world's oldest operating wooden hulled paddle steamer,  built in 1866. There are several historic vessels operating out of Echuca on a daily commercial basis, such as PS Pevensey (built 1911), PS Alexander Arbuthnot (built 1923), PS Adelaide (built 1866) operating from Echuca Wharf itself,  (built 1980 with a steam engine in use from 1906), PS Canberra (built 1913) and PV Pride of the Murray (built 1924 as a logging barge C24) operating from Riverboat Dock, a short distance downstream from the main wharf. These vessels conduct four to six 1-hour cruises daily, while Emmylou offers lunch, dinner, and scenic cruises. There are also a number of privately owned paddle steamers in Echuca, including PS Hero, PS Henry Charles, and the former Church of England mission steamer, PS Etona. As well as the paddle steamers there are numerous houseboats, many of which can be hired. MV Mary Ann (built 1981) operates as a cruising restaurant all year round.

The Port of Echuca is also restoring  to full working order. When operational, it will be added to the fleet of paddle steamers at Echuca Wharf.

Events and festivals
Annual events held in Echuca include the Southern 80 waterski race, the largest waterski race in the world, (February), the Riverboats Music Festival (February), the Echuca-Moama Weddings Expo (May), the Echuca Rotary Steam, Horse and Vintage Rally (Queens Birthday weekend in June) and WinterBlues Festival (July).

In popular culture
In 1983, the Australian television mini-series, All the Rivers Run, based on a novel by Nancy Cato and starring Sigrid Thornton and John Waters, was filmed in and around Echuca. The local paddle steamers Pevensey and Emmylou featured in the mini-series as PS Philadelphia and PS Providence, respectively. The airing of this series around Australia and internationally revitalised Echuca's tourism economy.

In 1985, parts of the Australian telemovie My Brother Tom (based on the book by James Aldridge) were filmed in Echuca.

In the TV series Glitch, Vic, the district supervisor for the police forces of Echuca, the fictional Yoorana, and surrounding communities, is based in Echuca.

The ABC aired an episode of Get Krack!n on 6 February 2019 satirising morning television segments about regional food and wine tourism. There was some concern locally about how the episode depicted the town and its effect on tourism, although the intent of the segment was to "[poke] fun at commercial morning breakfast shows and their often-condescending portrayal of rural and regional areas".

Restaurants and dining
Echuca has a variety of restaurants. Some that have been featured in The Age Good Food Guide include The Mill, Black Pudding Deli and Port 53.

A major dining attraction in Echuca was the well known wharf-side restaurant Oscar W's. It held a reputation for fine dining and was awarded a Chef's Hat in the 2013 Australian Good Food and Travel Guide and had previously been awarded a hat by The Age Good Food Guide. It closed in 2014.

Transport

Echuca is connected over the Murray River to Moama by the Echuca-Moama Road Rail Bridge, completed in 1878. This historically significant bridge has riveted iron spans supported on cast iron pillars. Trains no longer run on this bridge; a dedicated rail bridge has been constructed next to the old bridge, which now only carries road vehicles.

A second Murray River crossing was completed in July 2022.

Echuca-Moama Transit runs three bus services hourly to Echuca East, Echuca South and Moama. The terminus is the Old Echuca Post Office on Hare Street. V/Line operates the Echuca line rail service from the local station to Melbourne via Bendigo. Echuca Airport is also located nearby.

Media
The local newspaper, The Riverine Herald is published by McPherson Media Group three days a week.

Community radio station EMFM broadcasts in Echuca on the frequency of 104.7FM.

Education

Echuca is served by several primary schools: 208 Primary School, Echuca East Primary School, Echuca Specialist School, St. Mary's Primary School and the newly constructed Twin Rivers Primary School (opened in 2018). Twin Rivers was formed by merging the former Echuca West and Echuca South Primary schools, and shares a place with Echuca Twin River Specialist School (formerly Echuca Specialist School)

Echuca has two high schools. Echuca College, a state secondary college, was formed in 2006 by the amalgamation of Echuca Technical College and Echuca High School. St. Joseph's College, a Catholic co-ed secondary school, occupies the site of a former Brigidine convent that opened in 1886. Moama Anglican Grammar School, just over the border in New South Wales, also attracts students from Echuca.

Bendigo TAFE has a campus in Echuca, offering education up to diploma level in various fields.

Sport
The town has two Australian rules football clubs. The Murray Bombers competes in the Goulburn Valley Football League, while Echuca United competes in the Murray Football League.

The town is also home to the Echuca Rockets, an inclusive all ability football team competing in the Victorian FIDA Football League - Northern Conference.

Echuca has numerous other teams competing in regional and state sporting leagues, including netball, soccer, and field hockey. Echuca formerly fielded a baseball team, the Rich River Mariners, who played in the Goulburn Valley Baseball League. The team disbanded in 2006.

Echuca has a horse racing club, the Echuca Racing Club, which schedules around twelve race meetings a year including the Echuca Cup meeting in March.

Echuca Harness Racing Club conducts regular meetings at its racetrack in the town.

Golfers play at the Echuca Back Nine Golf Course on Eyre and McKenzie Streets.

Water sports
Swimming: Echuca Swimming Club. 50 metre indoor pool. YMCA Echuca War Memorial Aquatic Centre.
Canoeing: Echuca-Moama Canoe Club and  Inland Outriggers.
Waterskiing: The Southern 80 Ski Race held in February finishing line is in Echuca, starting at the Torrumbarry Weir. Established over  years ago the race is held by the Moama Water Sports Club. The Southern 80 has become iconic with the 2-day event attracting more than 80,000 visitors to the area. 
In 2006, the Barry Beehag water ski race was established in honour of Barry Beehag, a founding and life member of the Moama Water Sports Club.

Notable people
 James Ashton, politician
 Lou Bennett, musician
 Frank Block, politician
 Roy Cameron, pathologist
 Travis Fimmel, actor and model
 Henry Hopwood (1813–1869), founder of Echuca, born in Bolton, Lancashire, England
 Sarah Jones, journalist
 Hyllus Maris, Aboriginal activist
 Hugh McKenzie, politician and stock station agent.
 James McManus, naval officer
 Brian Lord, country music artist
 Bill Onus, Aboriginal activist
 Leith Ratten, convicted of murdering his wife
 Justin Smith, author and journalist
 Reginald Smithers, lawyer and judge

Sport
 George Bazeley, hockey player
 Geoff Bloomfield, equestrian
 Michael Braun,  Australian rules footballer
 Donna Burns, basketballer
 Clem Carr, Australian rules footballer
 Tommy Carr, Australian rules footballer
 Jane Chalmers, basketballer 
 Daniel Connors, Australian rules footballer
 Bert Cowley, Australian rules footballer
 Simon Eishold, Australian rules footballer
 Ted Fleming, Australian rules footballer
 Bert Foster, Australian rules footballer
 Gordon Geddes, Australian rules footballer 
 Jack Graham, Australian rules footballer
 Shadrach James, Australian rules footballer
 Bill Kyme, Australian rules footballer
 Phil McCumisky, Australian rules footballer 
 Mal McGillivray, Australian rules footballer 
 Ken Montgomery, Australian rules footballer
 Jack Mueller, Australian rules footballer
 Todd Murphy, cricketer
 Caitlyn Nevins, netball player 
 Kevin O'Neill, Australian rules footballer
 Clayton Oliver, Australian rules footballer
 Col Pearse, Paralympic swimmer
 Trevor Rowlands, Australian rules footballer
 Dick Robertson, Australian rules footballer
 Jack Quinn, Australian rules footballer
 John Quirk, Australian rules footballer
 Sam Sheldon, Australian rules footballer
 Thomas Swann, rower 
 Bill Talbot, Australian rules footballer
 Jack Viney, Australian rules footballer
 Andrew Walker, Australian rules footballer
 George Williams, Australian rules footballer
 Oliver Wines, Australian rules footballer

Sister city
Echuca's sister city was Whitehorse, Yukon, Canada. However, Whitehorse terminated the special relationship in 2008 due to the relationship being "strictly ceremonial in nature".

References

External links

 Echuca Moama Visitor Information Website
 Official Visitors Information for Echuca and its twin city Moama
 Echuca Wharf – Australian National Heritage listing

Towns in Victoria (Australia)
River ports of Australia
Echuca-Moama